Kalkaska is a village in the U.S. state of Michigan. Kalkaska is the county seat and only incorporated community of Kalkaska County, and is considered part of Northern Michigan. The population was 2,132 at the 2020 census, an increase from 2,020 at the 2010 census.

Kalkaska is part of the Traverse City micropolitan area, and is often considered a bedroom community of nearby Traverse City. The town is also renowned for hosting the National Trout Festival, with the first festivities being held in 1935.

History 

 
The land on which Kalkaska sits has long been territory under the Council of Three Fires; the Ojibwe, Odawa, and Potawatomi.

In 1872, Albert A. Abbott arrived on the land set to become the village from his hometown of Decatur. The following year, on May 12, 1873, Abbott platted his land, and became its first postmaster. In 1874, Kalkaska became a station on a new Pennsylvania Railroad line from Walton to Petoskey. Today, this line is part of the Great Lakes Central Railroad.

On July 5, 1908, a fire began in the middle of the business block and burned most of the stores. Local photographer E. L. Beebe made a number of photographs of the fire, and the resulting postcards were widely sold, and can still be found today. Two years later, in 1910 another fire started in downtown Kalkaska. Again, in 1925 downtown Kalkaska was devastated by the largest fire since the Fire of 1908.

In 1916, the noted author Ernest Hemingway visited and fished in Kalkaska, and later immortalized the town in his story "The Battler". A historical marker has been placed at the nearby Rugg Pond, on the Rapid River, where Hemingway reportedly fished one night from the power house.

On July 10, 1951, the Kalkaska State Bank was robbed by an armed man, who fled and later attempted to escape on foot through a nearby swampy area. After three days of what was termed the largest manhunt in Northern Michigan history, involving the FBI and local and state authorities, the gunman was captured south of the town. Named Raymond J. Turcotte, he had a long string of prior convictions, including manslaughter. Turcotte confessed to the bank robbery and served 18 years in the Michigan State Prison in Jackson, including a term for escape in 1961.

Discovery of natural gas and oil in the area during the 1970s lead to significant growth for the village; however, the growth has since shifted toward tourism.

In 1993, the Kalkaska schools made national headlines when a financial crisis resulted in a two-month-long closure. Subsequent funding reform improved the outlook for Kalkaska and similar small rural districts in Michigan.

In 2014 Walmart announced plans to open a store in Kalkaska. Previously the closest store was in Traverse City, 21 miles away. There was a debate in Kalkaska on whether the community's small town character can be preserved. The store was never built.

The Record Eagle reported in 2019 that Kalkaska was poised for substantial growth due to housing shortages in the Traverse City area.

Geography 

The North Branch of the Boardman River flows through the south of the village. The river continues west into neighboring Grand Traverse County, turns north, and empties into Grand Traverse Bay, a bay of Lake Michigan. Just to the north of the village, though, is the headwaters of the Little Rapid River. This stream also flows into the Grand Traverse Bay, although it is part of the Chain of Lakes watershed.

The primary constructors of Kalkaska's geographical make-up are ancient glaciers, along with the majority of the entire state of Michigan. Glaciers scoured the surface of Michigan during the Ice Age, creating small hills called drumlins, along with valleys and basins and the water that currently occupies them. This process is called glaciation.

Kalkaska experiences a notable amount of snowfall as it is located in a snowbelt that receives heavy amounts of lake effect snow from Lake Michigan.

Kalkaska is considered part of Northern Michigan.

Climate
This climatic region has large seasonal temperature differences, with warm to hot (and often humid) summers and cold (sometimes severely cold) winters.  According to the Köppen climate classification system, Kalkaska has a humid continental climate, abbreviated "Dfb" on climate maps.

Demographics

2010 census
As of the census of 2010, there were 2,020 people, 871 households, and 482 families residing in the village. The racial makeup of the village was 95.6% White, 0.6% African American, 1.3% Native American, 0.6% Asian, 0.2% from other races, and 1.7% from two or more races. Hispanic or Latino of any race were 1.8% of the population.

There were 871 households, of which 29.2% had children under the age of 18 living with them, 33.4% were married couples living together, 16.0% had a female householder with no husband present, 6.0% had a male householder with no wife present, and 44.7% were non-families. 38.6% of all households were made up of individuals, and 18.3% had someone living alone who was 65 years of age or older. The average household size was 2.22 and the average family size was 2.90.

The median age in the village was 37.9 years. 23.4% of residents were under the age of 18; 9.8% were between the ages of 18 and 24; 25.3% were from 25 to 44; 24.3% were from 45 to 64; and 17.1% were 65 years of age or older. The gender makeup of the village was 46.9% male and 53.1% female.

2000 census
As of the census of 2000, there were 2,226 people, 881 households, and 540 families residing in the village. The racial makeup of the village was 96.32% White, 0.67% African American, 1.03% Native American, 0.72% Asian, 0.04% from other races, and 1.21% from two or more races. Hispanic or Latino of any race were 0.94% of the population.

There were 881 households, out of which 33.7% had children under the age of 18 living with them, 38.3% were married couples living together, 18.3% had a female householder with no husband present, and 38.6% were non-families. 32.8% of all households were made up of individuals, and 14.3% had someone living alone who was 65 years of age or older. The average household size was 2.35 and the average family size was 2.94.

In the village, the age distribution of the population shows 26.1% under the age of 18, 10.6% from 18 to 24, 26.7% from 25 to 44, 19.4% from 45 to 64, and 17.2% who were 65 years of age or older. The median age was 35 years. For every 100 females, there were 88.3 males. For every 100 females age 18 and over, there were 82.5 males.

The median income for a household in the village was $27,891, and the median income for a family was $33,651. Males had a median income of $26,901 versus $19,333 for females. The per capita income for the village was $13,028. About 15.3% of families and 16.4% of the population were below the poverty line, including 19.7% of those under age 18 and 19.4% of those age 65 or over.

Transportation

Airport 
Kalkaska is home to Kalkaska City Airport, a small, paved runway.

Major highways 
 runs north–south through the village by the name "Cedar Street". Northeast of Kalkaska, US 131 runs through Mancelona, Alba, and Walloon Lake, before ending at US 31 in Petoskey. To the southwest, US 131 passes through Fife Lake before upgrading to a freeway. The highway continues south, passing through Cadillac, Grand Rapids, and Kalamazoo, before ending just south of the Indiana state line.
 also runs north–south through Kalkaska. The highway continues northeast, also as Cedar Street, into Mancelona, before turning north. The highway then runs through East Jordan before ending at US 31 in Charlevoix. To the south, M-66 runs through towns like Lake City, McBain and Marion. M-66 also eventually ends at the Indiana state line, just south of Sturgis.
 runs east–west through Kalkaska County, entering Kalkaska itself from the west. However through the heart of the village, it primarily runs north–south, also on the Cedar Street concurrency. West of Kalkaska, M-72 runs through the Traverse City urban area, ending at Empire, on Lake Michigan. East of Kalkaska, M-72 runs through Grayling and Mio before eventually ending at a junction with US 23 in Harrisville, on Lake Huron.

Education
Schools in Kalkaska are managed by Kalkaska Public Schools. There is one high school in the district, Kalkaska High School.

Kalkaska is centrally located between North Central Michigan College in Petoskey, Northwestern Michigan College in Traverse City, Kirtland College in Grayling/Gaylord, and Baker College in Cadillac.

Travel and recreation

Tourists are attracted to the area to visit the surrounding lakes (including Torch Lake) and rivers such as the Jordan River, Rapid River & Manistee River. Kalkaska offers two major festivals, the National Trout Festival held at the end of April to honor the opening of trout season, and the WinterFest which is held in January.  Fall color tours are also popular with visitors.

The first weekend of November brings with it the Iceman Cometh biking challenge. Kalkaska hosts the starting line for a 27.2 mile off-road biking race that runs from the heart of the village to Traverse City along the VASA Trail. The turnout for the race very easily doubles the population within the village, numbering in the several thousands. For mountain biking enthusiasts, this is a famous race, and completing the race is an achievement in itself.

The village has several parks, including the newly expanded KART trail which is planned to be connected with the TART Trail.

Industry
Marijuana, service, oil and gas, manufacturing, and tourism are important industries in the village and surrounding county.

The Kalkaska area is known as a fishing destination with inland lakes and the Boardman River, Rapid River, and Manistee River. Kalkaska has held the National Trout Festival in the last week of April each year since 1933. There is a giant statue of a brook trout in the town square. New York Times featured author Jim Harrison wrote about the Trout Festival in his 1991 book Just Before Dark: Collected Non-fiction.

Notable people
 Emil Frisk (1874–1922), professional baseball player for the Cincinnati Reds, Detroit Tigers, and the St. Louis Browns from 1899 to 1907
 Renee Raudman, voice and television actress
 Ron Ryckman Sr., member of the Kansas Senate
 Betty Wanless (1928–1995), All-American Girls Professional Baseball League player
 Ron Winter, former NCAA and NFL official

See also 

 Kalkaska sand

References

Further reading
 Jobst, Jack.   "Gone Fishin'",  Michigan History Magazine, November/December 1995.
 Hemingway, E.  The Complete Short Stories of Ernest Hemingway. Simon and Schuster, 1998. .

External links
Kalkaska Village website
Kalkaska Police Department
Kalkaska fire
Postcards of the fire
Kalkaska County Library

Villages in Kalkaska County, Michigan
Villages in Michigan
County seats in Michigan
Traverse City micropolitan area
1873 establishments in Michigan
Populated places established in 1873